Alda may refer to:


Places

United States
 Alda, Nebraska, a village
 Alda Township, Hall County, Nebraska

Spain
 Alda, Álava, a hamlet in Harana/Valle de Arana

People
 Alda (name), a given name and surname
 Alda (singer) (born 1966), Icelandic singer

Other uses
 Tropical Storm Alda, 1999
 Alda (automobile), a French automobile manufactured between 1912 and 1922
 Alda (comedy), a 12th-century elegiac comedy of William of Blois
 European Association for Local Democracy (ALDA), an international non-governmental organisation created in 1999
 Association of Late-Deafened Adults, an American organization for people who become deaf after childhood
 ALDA Events, a Dutch events management company

See also
 Alder (disambiguation)
 Aldavilla, New South Wales